Anwar Parvez (September 2, 1942 – June 17, 2006) was a Bangladeshi music composer and music director. He was awarded Ekushey Padak in 2007 by the Government of Bangladesh. He composed about 2,000 songs and worked as a music director in about 200 feature films.

Background
Singer Shahnaz Rahmatullah and actor Zafar Iqbal were Parvez's siblings.

Filmography
 The Rain (1976)
 Joy Bangla (1967)
 Abhijan (1984)
 Madhu Maloti
 Shonar Harin
 Talaq
 Shokal Shandhya

Awards
 Ekushey Padak (2007)
 Lifetime Achievement Award by Bangladesh Federation of Film Societies (2006)

References

External links
 

1944 births
2006 deaths
Recipients of the Ekushey Padak
Bangladeshi male musicians
Bangladeshi composers
Bangladeshi music directors
20th-century male musicians